Greg Swor (born April 19, 1951) is an American former ski jumper who competed in the 1972 Winter Olympics.

References

1951 births
Living people
American male ski jumpers
Olympic ski jumpers of the United States
Ski jumpers at the 1972 Winter Olympics
Sportspeople from Fargo, North Dakota